Albert H. Sealy, Jr. (October 23, 1917 – August 3, 2008) was a member of the Ohio House of Representatives. Sealy graduated from Ohio State University and received his law degree from Harvard Law School. He practice law and was an adjutant professor of public policy at Ohio State University.

References

Politicians from Columbus, Ohio
Ohio State University alumni
Harvard Law School alumni
Ohio lawyers
Ohio State University faculty
Republican Party members of the Ohio House of Representatives
1917 births
2008 deaths
20th-century American politicians
Lawyers from Columbus, Ohio
20th-century American lawyers